This is an incomplete list of airports in the Australian state of New South Wales.



List of airports
The list is sorted by the name of the community served, click the sort buttons in the table header to switch listing order. Cities in bold are international airports.

Defunct airports

References

See also
 List of airports in Greater Sydney
 List of airports in Australia

 
Airports
New South wales
Airports